The term "demurrage"  from Old French demeurage, from demeurer – to linger, tarry – originated in vessel chartering and referred to the period when the charterer remained in possession of the vessel after the period normally allowed to load and unload cargo (laytime). By extension, demurrage refers to the charges that the charterer pays to the ship owner for its delayed operations of loading/unloading. Officially, demurrage is a form of liquidated damages for breaching the laytime as it is stated in the governing contract (the charter party). The demurrage sometimes causes a loss to the seller as it increases cost of the total freight.

The inverse of demurrage is despatch. If the charterer requires the use of the vessel for less time than the laytime allowed, the charter party may require the shipowner to pay despatch for the time saved.

Shipping 
In commercial ship chartering, demurrage is an ancillary cost that represents liquidated damages for delays. It occurs when the vessel is prevented from loading or discharging cargo within the stipulated laytime (see affreightment: under Charter-parties). In the oil industry, it refers to the excess time taken to discharge or load, as the case may be, in excess of the allowed laytime. Laytime is the term used to quantify the time allowed within which an operation is allowed to be made. Demurrage is laytime consumed less laytime allocated (if any). The master of the ship must give a Notice of Readiness (NOR) to the charterer when the ship has arrived at the port of loading or discharge. The NOR informs the charterer that the ship is ready to load or discharge. The date and time of the NOR determines when laytime is to commence.

At the end of the stay in port, the port agent draws up a Statement of Facts, setting out a log of events during the ship's stay in port. The Statement of Facts enables a time sheet to be drawn up and signed by the master and the shipper or receiver of the cargo. The time sheet enables laytime and therefore demurrage or despatch to be calculated.

Container haulage 
Because the supply of a shipping container to a merchant has a similar nature to the contract of a supply of a vessel to a voyage charter, the industry refers to this container usage beyond the time allowed as Container Demurrage. This extra usage usually entitles the container supplier (usually the shipping carrier) to require a payment from the merchant.

In principle, it can be considered that the similarity between vessel demurrage and container demurrage is correct since both refer to the same concept, which is the late return of equipment supplied by one party to another for the purpose of carrying a cargo. However, the actual regime of container demurrage is still to be determined precisely.

In container haulage, customers are given a set period in their contract to tip (unload) their container delivery. Acceptable times for tipping are usually between 3 and 4 hours; time spent on site after that is considered "demurrage". Haulers will usually charge an hourly rate for each hour after the allowed time.

Demurrage can also refer to the cost levied by shipping lines to cover redecoration of the container after use by the merchant, but it could also be the charges by the shipping line to customers for not returning the container in a reasonable time.

Railway transport 

In railway law, it is the charge on detention of trucks (or rolling stock), either to the shipper for holding the car (laden or not), or to the connecting railroad(s) while the car is empty and returning to the home road (in either case, as a way to encourage speedy unloading and return of empties to improve utilisation of rolling stock).

Business and banking 
In business, demurrage is a delay in delivery of a product via delivery truck. When a delay occurs with product delivery, the delivery party can elect to claim a no fault delay by submitting a demurrage charge. Criteria for allowable demurrage, payment conditions, and payment terms for demurrage are typically prenegotiated and accepted by the vendor via contract prior to conduct of business. Some vendors allow free no-cost time for limited hour(s) when demurrage occurs, others do not allow free time for delays. The demurrage charge is normally an hourly rate. Unforeseeable until delivery, costs of delays are sometimes separately invoiced from the cost of deliverable.

In banking, demurrage is the charge per ounce made by the Bank of England in exchanging coin or notes for bullion.

References

External links

 Haugen Consulting LLC – What is demurrage?
 Demurrage-Calculation.com – How to calculate Demurrage?
 Variety of demurrage information & strategies
 Transaction Net – A "Green" Convertible Currency, Bernard A. Lietaer

Admiralty law
Legal terminology
Ship chartering
Intermodal containers